Ichthyotherapy is the use of fish such as Garra rufa for cleaning skin wounds or treating other skin conditions. The name ichthyotherapy comes from the Greek name for fish – ichthys. The history of such treatment in traditional medicine is sparsely documented. In a museum near the River Kwai, recording the privations of prison camps, a sketch drawn by a prisoner showed him up to his waist in water, but with small fish attending to his leg ulcers. There is widespread use of such fish in India, particularly in rural areas.
The most widely known form of ichthyotherapy is used in the treatment of skin conditions and involves the Garra rufa, commonly known as doctor fish or nibble fish. This fish occurs naturally in the Euphrates. The benefits were first observed in Kangal, Turkey; therefore, it is also called the Kangal fish. Many suffering from psoriasis and dermatitis have benefited from the treatment, which involves lying in the ponds and letting the fish eat the scales and loose skin on the affected areas. In fact such is the popularity of the treatment for skin conditions that Kangal became a health resort.

See also
Cleaning station
Maggot therapy – Use of maggots to selectively remove dying tissue 
Medical leech

References

 Pilot Study – "Evidence Based Complementary and Alternative Medicine", December 2006.
 Results of the Ichthyotherapy – Study
 VII An International Conference on Biotherapy (June 20–24, 2007, Seoul, Korea)

Traditional medicine
Biologically-based therapies
Fish and humans
Psoriasis